The following is a list of the 27 cantons of the Manche department, in France, following the French canton reorganisation which came into effect in March 2015:

 Agon-Coutainville
 Avranches
 Bréhal
 Bricquebec-en-Cotentin
 Carentan-les-Marais
 Cherbourg-en-Cotentin-1
 Cherbourg-en-Cotentin-2
 Cherbourg-en-Cotentin-3
 Cherbourg-en-Cotentin-4
 Cherbourg-en-Cotentin-5
 Condé-sur-Vire
 Coutances
 Créances
 Granville
 La Hague
 Isigny-le-Buat
 Le Mortainais
 Les Pieux
 Pont-Hébert
 Pontorson
 Quettreville-sur-Sienne
 Saint-Hilaire-du-Harcouët
 Saint-Lô-1
 Saint-Lô-2
 Valognes
 Val-de-Saire
 Villedieu-les-Poêles-Rouffigny

References